The 2011 FIVB World Grand Prix was a women's volleyball tournament played by 16 countries from 5 to 28 August 2011. The finals were held at the Macau East Asian Games Dome in Macau, China. The United States won the tournament defeating 3–0 to Brazil in the gold medal match and Destinee Hooker won the MVP award.

Competing nations
The following national teams qualified:

Squads

Pool standing procedure

1. Match points
2. Numbers of matches won
3. Sets ratio
4. Points ratio

Match won 3–0 or 3–1: 3 match points for the winner, 0 match points for the loser
Match won 3–2: 2 match points for the winner, 1 match point for the loser

Calendar

Preliminary round

Ranking
The host China and top seven teams in the preliminary round advanced to the Final round.

First round

Pool A

Pool B

Pool C

Pool D

Second round

Pool E

Pool F

Pool G

Pool H

Third round

Pool I

Pool J

Pool K

Pool L

Final round

The finals took place 24–28 August at the Macau East Asian Games Dome in Macau, China.

Pool A

Pool B

7th place match

5th place match

Semifinals

Bronze medal match

Final

Final standing

Individual awards

Most Valuable Player:

Best Spiker:

Best Blocker:

Best Server:

Best Receiver:

Best Libero:

Best Setter:

Best Scorer:

Best Digger:

References

External links
Official website of the 2011 FIVB World Grand Prix

FIVB World Grand Prix
2011 in Macau sport
International sports competitions hosted by Macau
2011
Volleyball in Macau